Miss USA 1993 was the 42nd Miss USA pageant, televised live from the Century II Convention Center in Wichita, Kansas on February 19, 1993. 
At the conclusion of the final competition, Kenya Moore of Michigan was crowned by outgoing titleholder Shannon Marketic of California. Moore became the second Miss USA titleholder from Michigan and the second African-American winner ever. The pageant was held in Wichita, Kansas, for the fourth and last consecutive year, and was hosted by Dick Clark for the final time, with color commentary by Leeza Gibbons (also for the final time) and Courtney Gibbs, Miss USA 1988.

This was also the last time the State Costume competition took place and would not return until twenty-eight years later in 2021, under a different organization.

Results

Placements

Special awards

Historical significance 
 Michigan wins competition for the second time.
 Georgia earns the 1st runner-up position for the first time and surpasses its previous highest placement in 1988. Also it reaches the state's highest ever placement in the pageant. This has yet to be equaled or surpassed.
 Kansas earns the 2nd runner-up position for the first time and reaches the highest placement since Kelli McCarty won in 1991, as well as Top 6 for the third year in a row.
 Hawaii finishes as Top 6 for the first time and reaches its highest placement since 1981.
 New Jersey finishes as Top 6 for the first time and reaches its highest placement since 1991.
 Pennsylvania finishes as Top 6 for the first time and reaches its highest placement since Michele McDonald won in 1971.
 States that placed in semifinals the previous year were California, Georgia, Kansas, South Carolina and Texas.
 California and Kansas placed for the third consecutive year. 
 Georgia, South Carolina and Texas made their second consecutive placement. 
 Hawaii, New Jersey and New York last placed in 1991.
 Michigan and Tennessee last placed in 1990.
 Pennsylvania last placed in 1989.
 Iowa last placed in 1960.
 Alabama, Arizona and North Carolina break an ongoing streak of placements since 1991.

Scores

Preliminary competition
The following are the contestants' scores in the preliminary competition.

 Winner
 First runner-up
 Second runner-up 
 Finalist 
 Semi-finalist

Final competition

 Winner
 First runner-up
 Second runner-up 
 Finalists

Delegates
The Miss USA 1993 delegates were :

Contestant notes
In a record for the time, eleven contestants had previously competed in either the Miss Teen USA or Miss America pageants:
Delegates who had previously competed at Miss Teen USA were:
Kelly Hu (Hawaii) - Miss Hawaii Teen USA and Miss Teen USA 1985
Jan Hoyer (Iowa) - Miss Iowa Teen USA 1987; her sister, Jeanne Hoyer was Miss Iowa in the Miss USA 1982 competition, however did not place in the top 12. 
Erin Nance (Georgia) - Miss Georgia Teen USA 1988
Jennifer Seminary (North Dakota) - Miss North Dakota Teen USA 1988
Kristen Anderson (Montana) - Miss Montana Teen USA 1988
Jana Durban (Colorado) - Miss Colorado Teen USA 1989
Stephanie Satterfield (Virginia) - Miss Virginia Teen USA 1989
Mary Ann Cimino (Maryland) - Miss Maryland Teen USA 1990
Tavia Shackels (Kansas) - Miss Missouri Teen USA 1990 (Top 12 semifinalist at Miss Teen USA 1990)
Allison Benusis (Connecticut) - Miss Connecticut Teen USA 1991
Delegate who had previously held a Miss America state title:
Amy Fissel (New Jersey) - Miss New Jersey 1991
Lisa Higgins (Indiana) competed in the 1990 Mother/Daughter USA Pageant representing the state of Kentucky

State notes
This was the first year that Kimberly Greenwood, Miss Tennessee USA 1989, directed the Miss Tennessee USA pageant.  She remains the director for Tennessee, and also for Georgia, and has produced two Miss USA winners.
This was the third out of seven years that introducing the delegates in regions. However, this was the first year that the states and the regions was designated differently from the United States Census Bureau.   (See List of regions in the United States#Census Bureau-designated regions and divisions for more information about the regions.)

Judges
Carol Alt
Richard Moll
Cristina Saralegui
Richard Alleman
Leah McCloskey
Fred Hayman
Tova Borgnine
Ron Greschner
Mitzi Kapture
Charley Pride

References

External links
Official website

1993
1993 beauty pageants
February 1993 events in the United States
1993 in Kansas